Rabbi Avraham Dov-Ber Kahana Shapiro (also spelled Shapira) (1870– February 27, 1943) was the last Chief Rabbi of Lithuania and the author of the three-volume work entitled Devar Avraham.

Biography
He was born in 1870  to Rabbi Shlomo Zalman Sender, a Kohen and author of Sefer Chidushei HaGarzas on Kodshim, on Motzaei Yom Kippur, in the city of Kobryn. R' Avraham was a descendant of R' Chaim Volozhin.

Education
He studied in the famed Volozhin Yeshiva, and was known as the illui m'kobrin, "the genius from Kobryn." The first volume of his magnum opus, the Devar Avraham, was published in 1906 when he was thirty-five years old.

Army service
When 18 year old Avraham was drafted into the Russian army and sent to Minsk, he used his limited spare time to "clandestinely enter the local Beis Midrash...  The Rav of Minsk, R' Yerucham Yitzchak Perlman..." worked to obtain his release, and subsequently "took him as a son-in-law."

Students
R' Avraham had many students, including R' Ephraim Oshry, author of Sheilos U'Teshuvos M'Mamakim.

Rabbi
He received his first rabbinical position at the age of 25, upon the passing of his father-in-law, and was named Chief Rabbi of the city of Kovno in 1923. He was the last Chief Rabbi of Lithuania.

Death
R' Avraham was in Switzerland for health reasons before the war broke out. His son, who was living in the United States, sent him a telegram to join him in the U.S. until the war's completion. His father, upon receiving the telegram, showed it to one of his close friends, stating emphatically, "The captain is the last to abandon his sinking ship, not the first. At this time of danger, my place is with the people of my city. I am going to Kovno."  He died of an illness in the Kovno Ghetto on February 27, 1943. He is buried in the same cemetery as Reb Yitchok Elchonon Spector Z'l. He is buried at the end of a row, one row before the Ohel of the Slabodka Rosh Yeshiva.

References

1870 births
1943 deaths
Lithuanian Orthodox rabbis
Chief rabbis
Kovno Ghetto inmates
Rabbis from Kaunas
19th-century Lithuanian rabbis
20th-century Lithuanian rabbis